De Baca County is a county in the U.S. state of New Mexico. As of the 2010 census, the population was 2,022, making it New Mexico's second-least populous county. Its county seat is Fort Sumner. The county is named for Ezequiel Cabeza De Baca, the second elected Governor of New Mexico.

Geography

Adjacent counties
 Guadalupe County - north
 Quay County - northeast
 Roosevelt County - east
 Chaves County - south
 Lincoln County - west

Demographics

2000 census
As of the 2000 census, there were 2,240 people, 922 households, and 614 families living in the county. The population density was 1 people per square mile (0/km2). There were 1,307 housing units at an average density of 1 per square mile (0/km2). The racial makeup of the county was 84.02% White, 0.04% Black or African American, 0.94% Native American, 0.22% Asian, 12.54% from other races, and 2.23% from two or more races. 35.27% of the population were Hispanic or Latino of any race.

There were 922 households, out of which 27.20% had children under the age of 18 living with them, 56.60% were married couples living together, 7.30% had a female householder with no husband present, and 33.30% were non-families. 30.80% of all households were made up of individuals, and 18.00% had someone living alone who was 65 years of age or older. The average household size was 2.35 and the average family size was 2.96.

In the county, the population was spread out, with 24.10% under the age of 18, 5.70% from 18 to 24, 21.70% from 25 to 44, 23.20% from 45 to 64, and 25.40% who were 65 years of age or older. The median age was 44 years. For every 100 females there were 96.00 males. For every 100 females age 18 and over, there were 92.10 males.

The median income for a household in the county was $25,441, and the median income for a family was $32,870. Males had a median income of $25,833 versus $18,487 for females. The per capita income for the county was $14,065. 17.70% of the population and 13.60% of families were below the poverty line. Out of the total people living in poverty, 23.30% are under the age of 18 and 15.00% are 65 or older.

2010 census
As of the 2010 census, there were 2,022 people, 912 households, and 581 families living in the county. The racial makeup of the county was 87.3% white, 0.6% American Indian, 0.1% black or African American, 7.9% from other races, and 3.9% from two or more races. Those of Hispanic or Latino origin made up 38.5% of the population. In terms of ancestry, 17.5% were German, 13.7% were American, 9.6% were English, and 7.4% were Irish.

Of the 912 households, 27.3% had children under the age of 18 living with them, 50.7% were married couples living together, 8.3% had a female householder with no husband present, 36.3% were non-families, and 32.7% of all households were made up of individuals. The average household size was 2.21 and the average family size was 2.78. The median age was 47.8 years.

The median income for a household in the county was $30,643 and the median income for a family was $36,618. Males had a median income of $27,460 versus $20,980 for females. The per capita income for the county was $20,769. About 15.9% of families and 21.6% of the population were below the poverty line, including 39.0% of those under age 18 and 18.3% of those age 65 or over.

Communities

Village
 Fort Sumner (county seat)

Census-designated place
 Lake Sumner

Unincorporated communities

 Agudo
 Buchanan
 Canton
 Cardenas
 Dunlap
 Evanola
 Ingleville
 La Lande
 Largo
 Ricardo
 Taiban
 Tolar
 Yeso

Ghost town
 Añal

Education
The county has a single school district: Fort Sumner Municipal Schools.

Notable people
Billy the Kid was killed and buried in Fort Sumner, New Mexico
 Lucien Maxwell, mountain man, rancher, scout, businessman, and farmer 
 Fern Sawyer, cowgirl, rodeo champion, and politician

Politics

See also
 National Register of Historic Places listings in De Baca County, New Mexico

References

 
1917 establishments in New Mexico
Populated places established in 1917